Grant County is a county in the U.S. state of Nebraska. As of the 2010 United States Census, the population was 614, making it the fourth-least populous county in Nebraska and the ninth-least populous county in the United States. Its county seat is Hyannis. The county was founded in 1887 and named for Ulysses S. Grant, 18th President of the United States.

In the Nebraska license plate system, Grant County is represented by the prefix 92 (it had the ninety-second-largest number of vehicles registered in the county when the license plate system was established in 1922).

Geography
Grant County terrain is characterized by continuous waves of east–west oriented rolling hillocks on otherwise flat areas. As a result, the county is dotted with small lakes and reservoirs.

Major highways
  Nebraska Highway 2
  Nebraska Highway 61

Adjacent counties

 Cherry County (north)
 Hooker County (east)
 Arthur County (south)
 Garden County (west)
 Sheridan County (northwest)

Demographics

As of the 2000 United States Census, there were 747 people, 292 households, and 226 families residing in the county. The population density was 0.95 people per square mile (0.37/km2). There were 449 housing units at an average density of 0.57 per square mile (0.22/km2). The racial makeup of the county was 98.80% White, 0.13% Native American, 0.27% Asian, 0.80% from other races. 1.34% of the population were Hispanic or Latino of any race.

There were 292 households, out of which 37.00% had children under the age of 18 living with them, 67.50% were married couples living together, 6.50% had a female householder with no husband present, and 22.60% were non-families. 22.30% of all households were made up of individuals, and 8.90% had someone living alone who was 65 years of age or older. The average household size was 2.56 and the average family size was 2.98.

The county population contained 29.20% under the age of 18, 5.20% from 18 to 24, 24.40% from 25 to 44, 27.60% from 45 to 64, and 13.70% who were 65 years of age or older. The median age was 40 years. For every 100 females there were 114.00 males. For every 100 females age 18 and over, there were 105.80 males.

The median income for a household in the county was $34,821, and the median income for a family was $37,011. Males had a median income of $26,319 versus $14,417 for females. The per capita income for the county was $14,815. About 8.20% of families and 9.70% of the population were below the poverty line, including 16.70% of those under age 18 and 0.00% of those age 65 or over.

Communities

Village 

 Hyannis (county seat)

Unincorporated communities 
 Ashby
 Whitman

Ghost town
 Duluth

Politics
Grant County is a solidly Republican county. The county hasn't voted for a candidate of the Democratic Party in a national election since 1936. In 2020, Donald Trump won the highest share of the vote ever in the county earning 93.3% of the vote.

See also
 National Register of Historic Places listings in Grant County, Nebraska

References

 
Nebraska counties
1887 establishments in Nebraska
Populated places established in 1887